A Crafty Youth (German: Ein ausgekochter Junge) is a 1931 German comedy film directed by Erich Schönfelder and starring Julius Falkenstein, Sig Arno and Olly Gebauer.  It was shot at the Grunewald Studios in Berlin. The film's sets were designed by the art directors Willi Herrmann and Herbert Lippschitz. It premiered in Hamburg in October 1931 and in Berlin the following month.

Synopsis
Ignaz Fischbein, an employee in a fashion store, is hypnotised by a magician into believing that is married to Mizzi a girl he has just met and the two proceed to take a holiday in Bavaria. There he encounters his boss, on a trip with his mistress posing as his wife, and the real husband of Mizzi.

Cast
 Julius Falkenstein as Adolf Strohbach, besitzer eines Modelhauses
 Sig Arno as Ignaz Fischbein, sein Hausdiener
 Paul Westermeier as Paul Kausulke, Bierkutscher
 Olly Gebauer as Mizzi, seine Braut
 Albert Paulig as Brahmaputra, ein Hypnotiseur
 Henry Bender as Hugo Kunkel, inhaber der Pension Waldfrieden
 Károly Huszár as Gregor Pawlowitsch, ein Anarchista-D 
 Maria Forescu as Vera, sein Gefährtin
 Lotte Werkmeister as 	Evchen Schikedanz
 Hermann Picha as 	Kasimir Makeldey, Naturforscher
 Elza Temary as 	Rolly-Polly, eine Tänzerin
 Gerhard Dammann as Hahn - Prokusist

References

Bibliography 
 Churton, Tobias. Aleister Crowley: The Beast in Berlin: Art, Sex, and Magick in the Weimar Republic. Simon and Schuster, 2014.
 Klaus, Ulrich J. Deutsche Tonfilme: Jahrgang 1931. Klaus-Archiv, 2006.

External links 
 

1931 films
Films of the Weimar Republic
German comedy films
1931 comedy films
1930s German-language films
Films directed by Erich Schönfelder
German black-and-white films
1930s German films